Shūji, Shuji or Shuuji (written: 修司, 修二, 修治, 修次, 州司, 収史, 秀司, 秀治, 秀史 or 秀爾) is a masculine Japanese given name. Notable people with the name include:

, Japanese handball player
, Japanese footballer
, Japanese actor
, Japanese politician
, Japanese environmentalist
, Japanese educator
, Japanese anime director
, Japanese film director and screenwriter
, Japanese actor
, Japanese professional wrestler
, Japanese politician
Shuji Kusano (born 1970), Japanese footballer
, Japanese jurist and politician
, Japanese badminton player
, Japanese shogi player
, Japanese academic
, Japanese shogi player
, Japanese poet, writer, film director and photographer
Shuji Tsushima (known as Osamu Dazai) (津島 修治, 1909–1948), notable Japanese author, known for writing The Setting Sun and No Longer Human
, Japanese gymnast
, Japanese volleyball player
, Japanese baseball player and coach

See also
27396 Shuji, a main-belt asteroid
Shunji
Bīja
Semolina, coarse middlings of durum wheat known as shuji in India 

 

Japanese masculine given names